The Colony of New South Wales was a colony of the British Empire from 1788 to 1901, when it became a State of the Commonwealth of Australia. At its greatest extent, the colony of New South Wales included the present-day Australian states of New South Wales, Queensland, Victoria, Tasmania, and South Australia, the Northern Territory as well as New Zealand. The first "responsible" self-government of New South Wales was formed on 6 June 1856 with Sir Stuart Alexander Donaldson appointed by Governor Sir William Denison as its first Colonial Secretary.

History

Formation
On 18 January 1788, the First Fleet led by Captain Arthur Phillip founded the first British settlement in Australian history as a penal colony. Having set sail on 13 May 1787, Captain Arthur Phillip assumed the role of governor of the settlement upon arrival. On 18 January 1788, the first ship of the First Fleet, HMS Supply, with Phillip aboard, reached Botany Bay. However, Botany Bay was found to be unsuitable by Phillip. After Phillip led the exploration of Port Jackson, he sailed and reached Sydney Cove on night of 25 January 1788. On the morning of 26 January, men on board this ship went ashore and started clearing land for a camp. In the afternoon-evening, they erected a flag pole, raised the Union Jack, and the officers ashore made toasts to the Royal Family and the success of the colony. Likely, some, or all, ships of the First Fleet were present for the flag raising. On the morning of 27 January, all the fit male convicts, marines, and likely some ships' crew went ashore to establish the camp and find food. The female convicts came ashore on 6 February 1788. About midday on 7 February, the convicts, marines and others who were staying were gathered by the Governor for the reading of the proclamation of New South Wales and a long reading of the rights of the convicts and others. Thus, the Colony of New South Wales was formally proclaimed on 7 February 1788. Before that, British naval administration applied.

Separation of Van Diemen's Land

Major-General Ralph Darling was appointed Governor of New South Wales in 1825, and in the same year he visited Hobart Town, and on 3 December proclaimed the establishment of the independent colony, of which he was Governor for three days.

Separation of South Australia

In 1834, the British Parliament passed the South Australia Act 1834, which enabled the province of South Australia to be established.

Separation of New Zealand

On 16 November 1840, the British government issued the Charter for Erecting the Colony of New Zealand. The Charter stated that the Colony of New Zealand would be established as a Crown colony separate from New South Wales on 1 July 1841.

Separation of Victoria 

On 1 July 1851, writs were issued for the election of the first Victorian Legislative Council, and the absolute independence of Victoria from New South Wales was established proclaiming a new Colony of Victoria.

Separation of Queensland

A public meeting was held in 1851 to consider Queensland's proposed separation from New South Wales. On 6 June 1859, Queen Victoria signed Letters Patent to form the separate Colony of Queensland. Brisbane was named as the capital city. On 10 December 1859, a proclamation was read by British author George Bowen, whereby Queensland was formally separated from the state of New South Wales. As a result, Bowen became the first Governor of Queensland. On 22 May 1860 the first Queensland election was held and Robert Herbert, Bowen's private secretary, was appointed as the first Premier of Queensland.

Federation 

The Federation of Australia was the process by which the six separate British self-governing colonies of Queensland, New South Wales, Victoria, Tasmania, South Australia, and Western Australia agreed to unite and form the Commonwealth of Australia, establishing a system of federalism in Australia. This effectively changed New South Wales from being a colony to a state of Australia.

Australia Act 

In the Australia Act 1986,the states of Australia achieved independence from the United Kingdom as constituents of Australian confederation. The Act followed discovery that, When Australia ratified the 1931 Statute of Westminster, only the federal state became independent of the United Kingdom because it was forgotten that Australia was a confederacy. The 1986 Act thus clarified the British government no longer had any authority over the six Australian unitary states in confederation, as well as no longer having authority over the Australian federal state, and that all colonial-era laws no longer were subject to power of disallowance and reservation. Acts of the federal state, i.e. the Commonwealth of Australia, remain subject to power of disallowance and reservation by the monarch of Australia, per sections 59 and 60 of the Australian Constitution. But as the Australian monarch can act only on the advice of the Australian Prime Minister, those two provisions are effectively dead letters.

See also 
 History of New South Wales
 History of Australia (1788–1850)
 History of Australia (1851–1900)

References

 
Former British colonies and protectorates in Oceania
Former penal colonies
Australian penal colonies
1788 establishments in Australia
1901 disestablishments in Australia